Ignas Navakauskas (born 22 September 1989) is a Lithuanian sprint canoeist. Competing in the individual K-1 200 m event he won bronze medals at the 2015 and 2016 European Championships. He placed ninth at the 2016 Olympics and fourth-fifth at the world championships in 2013–2015.

References

External links

 
 

Lithuanian male canoeists
1989 births
Living people
Sportspeople from Vilnius
Canoeists at the 2015 European Games
European Games competitors for Lithuania
Canoeists at the 2016 Summer Olympics
Olympic canoeists of Lithuania
Universiade medalists in canoeing
Universiade gold medalists for Lithuania
Medalists at the 2013 Summer Universiade